Samuel Moutoussamy (born 12 August 1996) is a professional footballer who plays as a midfielder for Ligue 1 club Nantes. Born in France, he represents the DR Congo national team.

He was born in Paris, France. His mother is Congolese, and his father is Indo-Guadeloupean of Tamil origin. Moutoussamy made his debut for DR Congo in October 2019.

Club career
Moutoussamy made his professional debut for Nantes in a 1–0 Ligue 1 loss to Marseille on 12 August 2017. On 6 October 2020, he joined Fortuna Sittard on loan.

On 29 January 2023, in the 0–0 draw against Clermont Foot, he played his 100th game in Ligue 1 with Nantes. Three days later, the club rewarded him for the achievement.

International career
Moutoussamy was born in France to an Indo-Guadeloupean father and a Congolese mother. He debuted for the DR Congo national team in a 1–1 friendly tie with Algeria on 10 October 2019.

Honours
Nantes
Coupe de France: 2021–22

References

External links
 
 
 
 
 

Living people
1996 births
Footballers from Paris
Association football midfielders
Democratic Republic of the Congo footballers
Democratic Republic of the Congo international footballers
French footballers
French people of Indian descent
French people of Tamil descent
French sportspeople of Democratic Republic of the Congo descent
French people of Guadeloupean descent
Democratic Republic of the Congo people of Guadeloupean descent
Democratic Republic of the Congo people of Tamil descent
AC Boulogne-Billancourt players
Olympique Lyonnais players
FC Nantes players
Fortuna Sittard players
Ligue 1 players
Championnat National 2 players
Championnat National 3 players
Eredivisie players
Democratic Republic of the Congo expatriate footballers
French expatriate footballers
Democratic Republic of the Congo expatriate sportspeople in the Netherlands
French expatriate sportspeople in the Netherlands
Expatriate footballers in the Netherlands
Black French sportspeople